KOPY is a Spanish Christian radio station broadcasting on 1070 AM. Licensed to serve Alice, Texas, United States, the station is currently owned by Claro Communications, Ltd.

References

External links

OPY
OPY (AM)
Radio stations established in 1977